Biggie Tembo Jr. (born 8 April 1988) is a Zimbabwean Jit musician who recorded for Gramma Records who released his debut album, Rwendo, in 2010. He is the son of Bhundu Boys singer Biggie Tembo.

In 2012 he was engaged by Alick Macheso to open his shows.

Rwendo track listing
 Mucherechedzo
 Mari
 Kamukana
 Simbimbino
 Usipo
 Rwemdo
 Nguva

References

Living people
Zimbabwean musicians
1988 births